The SEAT Altea is an automobile produced by the Spanish automaker SEAT from 2004 to 2015 being previewed by the Salsa Emoción concept. As a compact multi-purpose vehicle (MPV), the car was designed by the Italian Walter de Silva, and was launched in March 2004, as the first example of SEAT's new corporate look. The third generation Toledo was identical, except for the addition of a larger boot similar to the one in the Renault Vel Satis. It was launched at the 2004 Geneva Motor Show.

Another extended version, the Altea XL, is also available (having been first presented at the 2006 Paris Motor Show). In 2007, the Altea Freetrack, with four-wheel drive and higher suspension, was released.

On 21 August 2015, SEAT announced that the Altea and Altea XL had been discontinued. Although no direct replacement for the Altea was planned, SEAT is following the global shift from MPVs to SUVs, by launching its own SUV model based on the SEAT León. In February 2016, the Ateca was launched, which was the successor to the Altea according to CEO Luca de Meo: "For us, the Ateca is the replacement of the Altea."

Overview
The Altea was released a few years after many of its competitors arriving on the scene, but it was expected to sell well. However, it exceeded expectations, and 31,223 Alteas were sold within the first year. It is a family oriented five seater, which attempts to portray a more sporty image than most of its rivals. The car is based on Volkswagen Group's A5 (PQ35) platform.

An unusual design feature is the 'vertical parked' windscreen wipers, which are designed to improve pedestrian safety. They disappear in to the window surround either side of the screen. The effect is a completely cleanly swept windscreen, but does mean the 'A pillars' are rather wide and cause a blind spot.

There were six trim levels: Essence, Reference, Reference Sport, Stylance, Sport (no longer available in the United Kingdom) and FR. Internal combustion engines are available, with the range topping 2.0 FR Turbocharged Direct Injection (TDI) delivering , available since April 2006.

There are five gearboxes available (depending on market and engine); five or six speed manual, five speed tiptronic automatic, and six or seven speed Direct-Shift Gearbox. It is named after the Spanish city of Altea.

Safety
The SEAT Altea was tested in 2004, for its safety performance under the assessment scheme Euro NCAP, and it achieved an overall rating of five stars:
Adult occupant 
Child occupant 
Pedestrian

Awards
"Red Dot: Best of The Best" Design Award, from the Nordrhein-Westfalen (Germany) Design Centre 
'The World's Most Beautiful Automobile 2004', in Milan
'Autonis' Design Award, by the Auto-Strassenverkehr and MOT magazines
'Best Concept Car in 2003', by the Designers (Europe) organisation (for the SEAT Altea Prototipo) 
'Towncar of the Year' Award, by the Caravan Club, in collaboration with the English magazine What Car?
'Auto Trophy' 2004 and 2005, by the German car magazine Autozeitung 
“XII Edición de los Premios del Motor” award of 2005, by the Spanish magazine Telva 
'Coche de Flotas del Año' award of 2005, by the Spanish magazine Flotas
'Ampe' award in 2005 in the category Internet

Powertrain
The following powertrain specifications are available:

A flexible-fuel vehicle model was also on offer, under the label "MultiFuel", featuring the 1.6 MPI E85 102 bhp engine.

Seat Altea XL/Freetrack

The SEAT Altea XL is an  longer variant of the normal SEAT Altea, a five door five seat compact multi purpose vehicle (MPV), with increased luggage capacity compared to the standard Altea. It was launched at the Paris Motor Show in September 2006. Sales commenced in November 2006.

The SEAT Altea Freetrack is dimensionally similar to the Altea XL, but is designed as compact sport-utility vehicle (SUV). It features raised suspension for increased ground clearance and larger plastic bumpers, and plastic wheel arch and sill extensions, which all increase its exterior dimensions.

All versions of the Freetrack, except the 2.0 Turbocharged Direct Injection (TDI) 2WD, are equipped with a Haldex Traction based on demand four-wheel drive (4WD). The 4WD versions are also called Seat Altea 4. In Mexico and Russia, the SEAT Altea Freetrack is marketed simply as the SEAT Freetrack.

Although the Freetrack is available with 4WD, it is not marketed by SEAT as an "SUV". However, the Freetrack could be seen as a competitor for small SUVs from other marques. The possible internal combustion engine choices are almost the same as for the normal Altea. When launched, it was available in a very uncommon intense yellow. This colour was also seen on models in several promotional brochures - however the colour scheme went out of production by August 2010.

Gallery

Awards
 2006 Award, by the Asociación de Telespectadores de la Comunidad de Andalucía

Powertrain
The following powertrain options are available, with certain configurations utilising Volkswagen Groups highly regarded Direct-Shift Gearbox (DSG):

A flexible-fuel vehicle model was also on offer, under the label "MultiFuel", featuring the 1.6 MPI E85  engine.

Sales 
SEAT sold a total of 439 Altea models in the United Kingdom during 2014, and 445 Altea XLs.

Half a million SEAT Altea have been produced overall.

References

External links

 

Altea
Euro NCAP small MPVs
Compact MPVs
Front-wheel-drive vehicles
Cars introduced in 2004
2010s cars